Anja Schulz (born 28 October 1985) is a German politician for the FDP and since 2021 member of the Bundestag, the federal diet.

Biography 

Schulz was born 1985 in the West German town of Uelzen and became a bank accountant.

Schulz became member of the Bundestag in 2021.

References 

Living people
1985 births
People from Uelzen
Free Democratic Party (Germany) politicians
Members of the Bundestag 2021–2025
21st-century German politicians
21st-century German women politicians